The 2004–05 season of the Venezuelan Primera División, the top category of Venezuelan football, was played by 10 teams. The national champions were Unión Atlético Maracaibo.

Torneo Apertura

Torneo Clausura

Promotion/relegation playoff

External links
Venezuela 2004-05 season at RSSSF

Venezuelan Primera División seasons
Ven
Ven
2004–05 in Venezuelan football